Herman Graf (1873 in Frankfurt – 1940) was a German painter known for his introspective interior scenes.

Biography
Hermann Graf was a German realist painter about whose life unfortunately little is known.  He was born in Frankfurt am Main in 1873, son of Franz Josef Graf, and died in Weimar in 1940.  The latest work of his which can be positively dated appears to be 1908.  He lived in Weimar, and received his early artistic formation there under Max Thedy (1858-1924).  Later he studied at the Munich Academy under Karl von Marr (1858-1936) and Ludwig von Löfftz (1845-1910).

His style is one of quiet introspection and stillness, reminiscent of Vermeer in many ways.  Like Vermeer, he was fascinated by the play of light on objects, and rooms illuminated by light from a single window.  Graf specialized in interiors, often with a person engaged in a solitary task. He frequently included paintings in his compositions, as well as objects such as plates and vases for reflections or glints of light.  He also did seascapes.

After 1904 he exhibited regularly and was a member of the Munich artist cooperative. His works are in German and Hungarian museums.

Museum and gallery holdings

Berlin (Akademie der Künste): Still-life
Budapest: Bedroom in the Biedermeier Style
Budapest (Andrasy Gal.): Schiller's House
Weimar: Near the Lamp
Frankfurt am Main, Städelsches Kunstinstitut und Städtische Galerie, Der rote Tisch

Works

References

Additional Sources

 H. Weizsacker and A. Dessoff, Kunst und Kunstler in Frankfurt am Main im 19. Jahrhundert, Vol. II (1909)
 S. Raetzer in Westermanns Monatshefte, Vol. 127, I (1919), 251-61

1873 births
1940 deaths
Artists from Frankfurt
19th-century German painters
19th-century German male artists
20th-century German painters
20th-century German male artists